Hum To Mohabbat Karega (transl. I Will Love He Always) is a 2000 Indian Hindi thriller-comedy film. It was the first time Bobby Deol and Karisma Kapoor were paired. This film was inspired by the 1981 American film Eyewitness. The rights to this film are owned by Red Chillies Entertainment.

Plot 
Rajiv "Raju" Bhatnagar is a waiter in a popular hotel. He is in love with Geeta Kapoor, a famous news anchor. He is obsessed with her news segment. His big dream is to meet and marry her one day. He is assigned to feed the hotel customers and meets Mr. Desai who is also staying in his hotel. On his way out of Mr Desai's hotel room, he sees an unknown stranger named Ketu  going into his room. By the time Raju gets on the bottom floor, he sees blood dripping down from the top, and sees Mr Desai lying dead on the side of his room window. To investigate the murder is assigned to Geeta who comes to the hotel to interview people. Raju is dying to meet her, and the only chance to meet his love is to lie. Besides, she is engaged to her channel's head Rohit.

Raju lies to her and says he witnessed the murder. The unknown killer then decides to kill him too and begins to hunt for Raju. Meanwhile, Geeta is also looking for her brother Vikram, and to get all the information she can to find him, she seeks help from a convict named Gul Mahomed (Rajendra Tiwari) who was innocent, but still framed for illegal money-making by the Mafia. Vikram was trying to help Gul Hassan prove his innocence, but was kidnapped by the Mafia also. Then, Gul escaped from jail. Raju decides to help Geeta even at the cost of his life, but Geeta learns the truth and leaves him. When he looks for Geeta, he does not know that the Mafia and Police Force are all after him.

Meanwhile, Gul Mahomed is mysteriously murdered. Geeta and Raju meet after this murder scene and decide to get back together and look for the murderer who is a part of the Mafia. Soon enough, Raju is also kidnapped just like Vikram by the Mafia. The Mafia force him into being part of them, and a gangster. Raju also pretends to go along with them. However, when he goes to meet Geeta, the Mafia understand he was acting the whole way, and plan to kill him. Geeta rescues him, and Raju tells her the directions she needs to drive to escape from them. For some random reason, Raju knows everything there is in that village. May it be a river, motorboat or a monk's house, he knows it all. When Geeta asks him how he knows it, he tells her that she used to live there with him somehow.

Disregarding this, Raju steals diamonds from Mr Desai's special locker, with the help of Geeta. But soon enough, Geeta finds he has disappeared with all the diamonds and was actually a part of the Mafia all along. Geeta realizes this, cries and walks out of his life. But when she leaves, it is revealed that he only acted like he was part of them because the rest of the Mafia had kidnapped his friend Kutty and his girlfriend Vishali. Geeta and Rohit (her news channel's head) are about to get married, but before the marriage, Raju shows up and gives her proof that Rohit is actually the killer. He has also shot her brother Vikram. He wanted to make new TV news channels and in order for that, he needed the diamonds Mr Desai had, and Mr Desai's real name was actually Patel.

Vikram found out about Rohit's plans and was going to tell the media. But just before, Rohit murdered and hid Vikram and Gul Mahomed's daughter. That is the reason Gul Mahomed wanted to meet Geeta to tell her that Rohit is the murderer. Rohit is going to force Geeta to marry him, but Raju jumps in and rescues her. Raju and Geeta then record the Mafia and Rohit at the counterfeit notes were being made, giving a live feed. Raju with the Police Force surrounds the whole Mafia, and arrest them. However, Rohit takes Geeta and runs away. Raju chases after them, but Rohit is waiting around the corner. Once Raju runs inside, Rohit shoots him and Raju collapses. Rohit is just about to kill Geeta, but Raju comes back and throws him off the top of the factory they were inside.

In the end, Raju is rewarded by a chance to work with the news channel Geeta works with, and the two arrange for their marriage.

Cast

 Bobby Deol as Rajiv "Raju" Bhatnagar 
 Karishma Kapoor as Geeta Kapoor, Press Reporter
 Johnny Lever as Kutti 
 Maleeka R Ghai as Varsha 
 Sadashiv Amrapurkar as Inspector Shinde 
 Shakti Kapoor as Ketu
 Dalip Tahil
 Vijay Kashyap as Havaldar Rokde
 Rohit Roy as Rohit
Smita Bansal as Sanjana , Press Reporter

Soundtrack
The soundtrack of the film contains 8 songs. The entire music is conducted by Anu Malik, The songs are authored by Majrooh Sultanpuri and available on HMV/The Gramophone Company of India.

References

External links

2000 films
2000s Hindi-language films
Films scored by Anu Malik
Films scored by Surinder Sodhi
Films directed by Kundan Shah